Bletchley Town F.C. was a football club based in Fenny Stratford near Bletchley, a constituent town of Milton Keynes in Buckinghamshire, England. The business was dissolved on 29 January 2013. For the 2012–13 season, the first team was a member of the Spartan South Midlands League Division Two.

History

The first Association Football club to represent Bletchley was formed in 1914 as Bletchley Sports, and after the first world war the club became Bletchley Sports Club. The club joined the Bedfordshire and District County League in the 1927–28 season, which became the South Midlands League two seasons later. At the start of the 1930–31 season the club again changed its name, this time to Bletchley Town Sports. The club stayed in the South Midlands league until the end of the 1933–1934 season, when they finished bottom of division one and left the league.

After the Second World War, "Bletchley L M S" took over the Bletchley colours, operating from 1947 to 1960 but gaining competition from 1952 from "Bletchley B B O B" (later called "Bletchley United") which played until 1976.

Meanwhile, Bletchley Town resumed competing in the South Midlands League in 1948 before transferring to the Spartan League Division One for the 1952/3 season. They gained promotion to the Premier Division as champions in only their first season. From 1954/5 (the last season of their first period in the Spartan League) they played under the name of "Bletchley & Wipac Sports Club" and two seasons later, for the 1956–57 campaign, changed their name to "Bletchley & WIPAC" by which time they had joined the Hellenic League. The club became Bletchley Town F.C. again a season later, and stayed in the Hellenic league until the end of the 1958–59 season after which they played for a season back in the Spartan League before becoming members of the United Counties League. They moved leagues again when they joined the Metropolitan League in the 1968–69 season, but three years later they switched leagues again by joining the Southern Football League, spending the next few seasons switching between Division one North and south.

Once again the club changed its name, this time to Milton Keynes City at the beginning of the 1974–75 season. The club continued in the southern league until the 1984–85 season, when the club folded, with their only notable achievement winning the Berks and Bucks cup in the 1979–80 season.

2005 to 2014

However once again the club was reborn and as per usual with a change of name, 'Bletchley Town F.C.', for the 2005–06 season. The club started life in the North Bucks & District Football League and two seasons later were in the Spartan South Midland league.

By March 2014, the club had disbanded.

On 21 October 2014, its name was (re?)registered as a private limited company.

Previous clubs representing Bletchley
With the many club name changes there have been several teams that also have represented Bletchley over the years that may be confused
with Bletchley Town.
 Bletchley L M S (1947 to 1960)
 Bletchley B B O B (1952 to 1957 then changed name to Bletchley United)
 Bletchley United (1957 to 1976)

Ground

Bletchley Town played their games at Manor Field, Bletchley, Buckinghamshire MK2 2HX. In 2010 the club put in a proposal to the council to construct a 2600 capacity playing arena.

Club honours

United Counties League :
 Runners-up: 1967–68
South Midlands League Premier Division:
 Winners: 1955–56
Berks and Bucks Senior Cup:
 Winners: 1979–80

Current club honours

North Bucks & District League Division one :
 Runners-up: 2007–08
North Bucks & District Division two trophy :
 Runners-up: 2005–06

Club records

For all Bletchley Town teams.

Highest League Position: 9th in Southern League Division One South 1972–73
F.A Cup best Performance: Fourth qualifying round 1964–65, 1965–66
F.A Trophy best Performance: Second qualifying round 1977–78, 1978–79
F.A. Vase best performance: Fourth round 2001–02

Former players

For all Bletchley Town teams.

1. Players that have played/managed in the football league or any foreign equivalent to this level (i.e. fully professional league).
2. Players with full international caps.
Brian Gibbs
Bob Morton

External links
Club website
The History of Football in Milton Keynes
 BLETCHLEY TOWN FOOTBALL CLUB LIMITED Company number 09273511 Companies House records show that the business name was incorporated again on 21 October 2014 and that, [as of October 2016], it continued to maintain that record, but no other evidence is available to show any ongoing sporting activity.

References

Defunct football clubs in England
Defunct football clubs in Buckinghamshire
Sport in Milton Keynes
Association football clubs established in 1914
1914 establishments in England
Association football clubs disestablished in 1974
Association football clubs disestablished in 2013
Association football clubs established in 2005
Works association football teams in England